Oana Țiplea, formerly known as Oana Chirilă or as Oana Şoit (born 3 May 1981) is a Romanian handball player who plays as a right back for Măgura Cisnădie.

International honours 
EHF Champions League:
Finalist: 2011
EHF Champions League:
Finalist: 2010
World Championship:
Silver Medalist: 2005
European Championship:
Bronze Medalist: 2010  
Junior European Championship:
Gold Medalist: 2000
Youth European Championship:
Gold Medalist: 1999
World University Championship:
Gold Medalist: 2002

Individual awards   
 All-Star Right Wing of the Youth European Championship: 1999
 All-Star Right Back of the Junior European Championship: 2000 
 EHF Cup Top Scorer: 2007, 2010

References

External links
Profile at eurohandball.com

Living people
Sportspeople from Cluj-Napoca
Romanian female handball players
1981 births
Expatriate handball players
Romanian expatriate sportspeople in Spain
SCM Râmnicu Vâlcea (handball) players